Highway 43, the Elk Valley Highway, is the easternmost spur off of the British Columbia segment of the Crowsnest Highway (Highway 3), in the Regional District of East Kootenay. The highway, which is two lanes, starts in Sparwood, and travels 35 km (22 mi) north along the Elk River to the community of Elkford, where a connection to Elk Lakes Provincial Park, on the border with Alberta, is located.  The route received its designation in 1983, and it has not been re-aligned.

References

043